Tommy Naughton is the former manager of the Dublin Senior Hurling team and the former Under 21 hurling manager for Dublin. He had also previously been a selector with the senior hurling team. Naughton had Andy Cunningham, Mick O'Riordan and Damien Byrne as his management team for Dublin.

Managerial career

Dublin

2006
After being appointed manager in late 2005, Naughton guided Dublin to the 2006 Division 2 National Hurling League. This title win ensured Dublin a place in Division One for 2007. The Liam MacCarthy Cup proved a difficult period for Naughton as his team failed to win a game in the competition until the relegation match against Westmeath. Dublin managed to retain their McCarthy Cup status for the 2007 season while Westmeath will play in the Christy Ring Cup for 2007.

2007
Naughton's 2007 season opened with a draw against Kilkenny in the 2007 National Hurling League. Naughton's Dublin kept their momentum by going on to defeat Galway in Parnell Park which his team in fourth position with one game in hand. Dublin then went on to continue there unbeaten run in the National Hurling League by defeating Limerick. That victory left Naughtons Dublin side in third position in the league with a game in hand over Antrim.  Dublin lost the game against Antrim and then lost their final game against Tipperary which meant that Dublin missed their chance to qualify for the quarter finals or semi-finals.

Naughton first match against Wexford was seen as the potential breakthrough match for Dublins young senior hurling team in the All-Ireland Senior Hurling Championship. Dublin showed that the gap is lessening being themselves and the bigger teams but Wexford came out of the game with the one point win with a late point from Barry Lambert. Naughtons hurlers must now play in the qualifiers of the all-Ireland championship against Cork, Offaly and Limerick or Tipperary. The Dublin team were scheduled to play their first game against Cork in Parnell Park. Cork wrote a letter to the Competitions Control Committee to request that the game be played at a neutral venue, this was met with anger by both the Offaly and the Dublin managers who were playing at home on the first weekend of the qualifiers. A change of venue never materialised and Cork played Dublin in Parnell Park in a game which Cork won by 3-20 to 0-15. Dublins next game in the qualifiers was against Tipperary who had previously beaten Dublin in the league. Naughtons men put on a good performance against Tipperary but faded towards the end, leaving Dublin at the bottom of the table.

References

External links
Official Dublin GAA Website
Scoil Uí Chonaill Website

Living people
Year of birth missing (living people)
Wicklow hurlers
Hurling managers